Henry Joseph Newbound (25 September 1881 – 2 October 1961) was a former Australian rules footballer who played with Collingwood and Carlton in the Victorian Football League (VFL).

Notes

External links 

Harry Newbound's profile at Blueseum

1881 births
1961 deaths
Australian  rules footballers from Victoria (Australia)
Collingwood Football Club players
Carlton Football Club players